Criminal Girls: Invite Only is a role-playing video game developed by Imageepoch and published by Nippon Ichi Software. It was originally released as Criminal Girls on November 18, 2010 for PlayStation Portable, in Japan only. An enhanced port for PlayStation Vita was released in Japan on November 28, 2013, and the rest of the world in February 2015, and for Steam on January 11, 2017. The "unabashedly risqué Japanese game" was controversially censored for its Western release, by "stripping the sound and obscuring the action".

Plot 
The main character is sent to hell and tasked with rehabilitating seven girls.

Gameplay 
Gameplay involves a lot of dungeon crawling and other RPG elements.

Reception 

The PlayStation Vita and PC versions received "mixed" reviews according to the review aggregation website Metacritic. GameSpot thought the combat was let down by the "tedious design" and "perverse activities". In Japan, Famitsu gave it a score of 28 out 40 for the PSP version, and 29 out of 40 for the PlayStation Vita version.

Legacy 
A sequel entitled Criminal Girls 2: Party Favors was released in Japan on November 26, 2015, and in the rest of the world in 2016.

Notes

References

External links 
 

2010 video games
2013 video games
Censored video games
Erotic video games
Nippon Ichi Software games
PlayStation Portable games
PlayStation Vita games
Role-playing video games
Single-player video games
Video games developed in Japan
Windows games